A revolver bond is a financial product, a variant of a regular bond or other debt security.

In the example of a regular bond issue, when a corporation purchases a government bond for a notional amount, the government in question agrees to pay interest on that amount to the corporation until the bond maturity.

In the case of a revolver bond, while the buyer and seller agree to a notional amount, they also agree that the buyer has the right to "draw" upon a certain amount of the notional and the seller will only pay interest on this drawn amount, which can be any value up to the original notional.  No interest will be paid on the undrawn amount.

See also
Revolving credit
Revolving account

References

Bonds (finance)